A wicket-keeper-batter is a type of player in cricket who fields primarily as a wicket-keeper and is particularly adept as a batter.  While they offer a similar advantage to a team as an all-rounder, that term is usually used to refer to players who can both bat and bowl to a high standard.  

Traditionally, wicket-keepers were chosen in international Test sides primarily because of their wicket-keeping abilities. Wicket-keeping is regarded as the most strenuous fielding position, due not only to its physical demands but also its mental and psychological ones.   Teams would therefore choose wicket-keepers based on their wicket-keeping skill. This caused Test nations to select players who could specialise in wicket-keeping. This type of specialisation would often lead to these players focusing less on their batting.  During this period, while elite-level wicket-keepers were typically better batters than specialist bowlers, their batting average was usually considerably lower than the specialist batters on the team.  For example, Alan Knott, who played 95 Test matches for England in the 1960s, 1970s and 1980s, averaged 31 over a long career.  By comparison, Geoffrey Boycott, who had a similarly long career as a batter for England in the same period, averaged 47.72.     

In the 1990s, teams started fielding wicket-keepers who were especially talented batters. This trend began largely with Adam Gilchrist, who was Australia's wicket-keeper in Tests and ODIs. After his example, the top cricketing teams and aspiring wicket-keepers saw the extraordinary value wicket-keeper-batters could have for a side. Other batters who followed Gilchrist's example and have since been fully integrated into their national sides as top wicket-keeper-batters include Andy Flower, MS Dhoni, Rishabh Pant, Brendon McCullum, Mark Boucher, Dinesh Karthik, Quinton de Kock, Jos Buttler, Kumar Sangakkara, Mohammad Rizwan and Tom Latham, as well as Alyssa Healy and Sarah Taylor.

In the modern game, wicket-keepers are often expected to contribute as much with the bat as middle-order batters might be.

Notably, some international players selected mostly for their batting skills have been asked to keep for short periods of time. Ambati Rayudu, A. B. de Villiers, Johnny Bairstow, Tillakaratne Dilshan, Rahul Dravid, Marcus Trescothick, KL Rahul, Beth Mooney etc. are among such occasional wicket-keepers.

In the 2010s, more teams pick multiple wicketkeeper-batters to offer more depth on both batting and fielding, with the players not wearing the gloves fielding from slips to mid-on, bat-pad or even as an outfielder. Some of them could be ageing former wicketkeepers that can no longer crouch and withstand the rigours of being wicketkeepers, or young keepers with poorer wicketkeeping skills compared to the incumbents, but still good enough to function elsewhere on the field on top of being able batters.

See also
Cricket terminology
Fielding (cricket)
Batting (cricket)

References

Cricket terminology
Wicket-keepers